Helcystogramma thiostoma is a moth in the family Gelechiidae. It was described by Edward Meyrick in 1929. It is found in southern India.

The wingspan is about 18 mm. The forewings are dark purplish fuscous, with the stigmata blackish, the first discal and plical minute, indistinct, with the plical slightly posterior, the second discal distinct. The veins are posteriorly slightly streaked darker. The hindwings are grey.

References

Moths described in 1929
thiostoma
Moths of Asia